Lovoa is a genus of plants in the family Meliaceae. It contains the following species:
 Lovoa swynnertonii Baker f.
 Lovoa trichilioides Harms

 
Meliaceae genera
Taxonomy articles created by Polbot